The 2020–21 season Mohammedan SC's is 13th consecutive and 85th overall seasons in top-flight football since professional competition formed on 2007 in Bangladesh. The season covering a period from 24 December 2020 to August 2021.

Current squad
Dhaka Mohammedan squad for 2020–21 season.

Competitions

Overview

Federation Cup

Group stage

Group D

Knockout phage

Premier League

League table

Results summary

Results by round

Matches

Statistics

Goalscorers

Source: Matches

References

Mohammedan SC (Dhaka) seasons
Bangladeshi football club records and statistics
2020 in Bangladeshi football
2021 in Bangladeshi football